Ermengarde of Zutphen (died 1138) was countess of Zutphen (1122–1138), succeeding her elder brother Henry II, Count of Zutphen (her other two brothers had taken holy orders and died respectively).  Their parents were Otto II, Count of Zutphen and Judith of Arnstein.

She first married around 1116 to Gerard II († 1131), count of Guelders and of Wassenberg, and had :
 Henry I († 1182), count of Guelders and of Zutphen
 Adélaïde, married Ekbert, count of Tecklenburg
 Salomé († 1167), married Henry I, count of Wildeshausen

Widowed, she remarried to Conrad II († 1136), count of Luxembourg, but the marriage remained childless.

Sources 
 Ermgard, 1118-1129, Gravin van Zutphen

1138 deaths
Counts of Zutphen
Countesses of Luxembourg
Year of birth unknown
Medieval Dutch women
12th-century women of the Holy Roman Empire